Michael Tierney (September 29, 1839 – October 5, 1908) was an Irish-born prelate of the Roman Catholic Church. He served as Bishop of Hartford, Connecticut from 1894 until his death in 1908.

Biography
Michael Tierney was born in Ballylooby, County Tipperary, to John and Judith (née Fitzgerald) Tierney. At age eleven he, his mother and his siblings, his father having died in the Famine, came to the United States, where they settled at South Norwalk, Connecticut. He studied at St. Thomas Seminary in Bardstown, Kentucky, and at St. Joseph's Seminary in Troy, New York. He was ordained to the priesthood on May 26, 1866.

Rector
Bishop McFarland named Tierney chancellor of the Diocese of Hartford and rector of the cathedral, which then located in Providence, Rhode Island. He was then served as pastor of St. Mary of the Star of the Sea Church in New London until 1872, when he was transferred to St. John's Church in Stamford. He became rector of St. Peter's Pro-Cathedral at Hartford in 1877. St. Peter's had been designated the pro-cathedral of the diocese, pending the construction of St. Joseph's Cathedral. As pastor, Tierney was responsible for  the pastoral care of Wethersfield State Prison and St. Lawrence O'Toole, a "chapel of ease" near the Rocky Hill Quarry. He was also tasked task with overseeing the construction of St. Joseph's Cathedral. On June 26, 1881, Bishop McMahon celebrated a Pontifical High Mass at St. Peter's to commemorate the centennial of a Mass offered nearby for Count Rochambeau's troops during the Revolutionary War, and popularly thought to be the first Mass said in Connecticut. In 1883, Tierney was appointed pastor of St. Mary's Church in New Britain.

Bishop
On December 2, 1893, Tierney was appointed the sixth Bishop of Hartford by Pope Leo XIII. He received his episcopal consecration on February 22, 1894 from Archbishop John Joseph Williams, with Bishops Matthew Harkins and Thomas Daniel Beaven serving as co-consecrators, at Hartford. One of his early acts was to send Rev. Tomasz Misicki to New Britain to assist the Polish community in establishing Sacred Heart parish.

During his 14-year-long tenure, Tierney founded St. Thomas Seminary; St. Mary's Home for the Aged; St. John's Industrial School; the hospitals at Hartford, New Haven, Bridgeport, Waterbury, and Willimantic; and numerous charitable institutions conducted by the Sisters of the Holy Ghost and the Little Sisters of the Poor. He also established a diocesan missionary band to preach retreats to Catholics and non-Catholics alike. At the time of his arrival in Hartford, there were 98 parishes, 204 priests, and 48 parochial schools; by the time of his death, there were 166 parishes, 300 priests, and 76 parochial schools.

Tierney died October 5, 1908 at Hartford, aged 69.

References

External links
Roman Catholic Archdiocese of Hartford

Episcopal succession

1839 births
1908 deaths
Irish emigrants to the United States (before 1923)
Saint Joseph's Seminary (Dunwoodie) alumni
20th-century Roman Catholic bishops in the United States
Roman Catholic bishops of Hartford
19th-century Roman Catholic bishops in the United States
Irish expatriate Catholic bishops